MagicPlot is a technical plotting, curve fitting and data analysis application. It provides a wide usage of the graphical user interface for data exploration as well as various statistical analysis tools, peak fitting options, raster or vector formats of publishable plots.

MagicPlot is a commercial software. The limited functional trial version is also available.

References

External links
 

2008 software
Data analysis software
Plotting software
Regression and curve fitting software
Java (programming language) software